Gaelcholáiste na Mara is a secondary school located in Arklow, County Wicklow, Ireland, which was founded in 2007.

It is run by the Kildare/Wicklow Education and Training Board (KWETB). At a Gaelcholáiste the pupils are taught through the medium of the Irish language.
The school offers a range of subjects at both junior cycle and senior cycle.

References

2007 establishments in Ireland
Educational institutions established in 2007
Gaelcholáiste
Irish-language schools and college
Secondary schools in County Wicklow